Tupac Amaru Inca District is one of eight districts of the province Pisco in Peru.

References

1986 establishments in Peru